The following outline is provided as an overview of and topical guide to Lebanon:

Lebanon – sovereign country located along the eastern edge of the Mediterranean Sea in Southwest Asia and the Middle East.  Lebanon, due to its tense sectarian diversity, has a unique political system, known as confessionalism, in which each religious group is allocated a fixed number of seats in parliament. The country enjoyed a period of relative calm and prosperity before the devastating Lebanese Civil War from 1975 to 1990. In 2005, a wave of demonstrations known as the Cedar Revolution ended the 30-year Syrian occupation of Lebanon. By early 2006, a considerable degree of stability had been achieved throughout much of the country and Beirut's reconstruction was almost complete, but a debilitating 2006 war and internal strife caused significant economic damage and loss of life. Lebanon has shown remarkable resilience to the Late 2000s recession.

General reference 

 Pronunciation:
 Common English country name:  Lebanon
 Official English country name:  The Lebanese Republic or the Republic of Lebanon
 Common endonym(s):  
 Official endonym(s):  
 Adjectival:  Lebanese
 Demonym:  Lebanese
 Etymology: Name of Lebanon
 International rankings of Lebanon
 ISO country codes:  LB, LBN, 422
 ISO region codes:  See ISO 3166-2:LB
 Internet country code top-level domain:  .lb

Geography of Lebanon 

Geography of Lebanon
 Lebanon is a country
 Location
 Northern Hemisphere and Eastern Hemisphere
 Eurasia
 Asia
 Southwest Asia
 Eastern shore of the Mediterranean Sea
 Middle East
 The Levant
 Time zone:  Eastern European Time (UTC+02), Eastern European Summer Time (UTC+03)
 Extreme points of Lebanon
 High:  Qurnat as Sawda' 
 Low:  Mediterranean Sea 0 m
 Land boundaries:  454 km
 375 km
 79 km
 Coastline:  Mediterranean Sea 225 km
 Population of Lebanon: 6,824,986  - 106th most populous country
 Area of Lebanon: 10,452 km2
 Atlas of Lebanon

Environment of Lebanon 

 Climate of Lebanon
 Renewable energy in Lebanon
 Geology of Lebanon
 Protected areas of Lebanon
 Biosphere reserves in Lebanon
 National parks of Lebanon
 Wildlife of Lebanon
 Fauna of Lebanon
 Birds of Lebanon
 Mammals of Lebanon

Natural geographic features of Lebanon 

 Glaciers of Lebanon
 Islands of Lebanon
 Lakes of Lebanon
 Mountains of Lebanon
 Volcanoes in Lebanon
 Rivers of Lebanon
 Waterfalls of Lebanon
 Valleys of Lebanon
 List of World Heritage Sites in Lebanon

Regions of Lebanon 

Regions of Lebanon

Ecoregions of Lebanon 

List of ecoregions in Lebanon
 Ecoregions in Lebanon

Administrative divisions of Lebanon 

Administrative divisions of Lebanon
 Governorates of Lebanon
 Districts of Lebanon
 Municipalities of Lebanon

Governorates of Lebanon 

 Governorates of Lebanon
 Akkar
 Baalbek-Hermel
 Beirut
 Beqaa
 Mount Lebanon
 Nabatieh
 North
 South

Districts of Lebanon 

Districts of Lebanon

Municipalities of Lebanon 

Municipalities of Lebanon
 Capital of Lebanon: Beirut
 Cities of Lebanon

Demography of Lebanon 

 Demographics of Lebanon
 Religion in Lebanon
 Christianity in Lebanon
 Lebanese Maronite Christians
 Lebanese Greek Orthodox Christians
 Lebanese Melkite Christians
 Lebanese Protestant Christians
 Lebanese Baptists
 Armenian Apostolic Christians
 Armenian Catholics
 Minorities (Lebanon)
 Islam in Lebanon
 Lebanese Shia Muslims
 Lebanese Sunni Muslims
 Lebanese Druze
 Alawites in Lebanon
 Judaism in Lebanon
Ethnic groups
Syrians in Lebanon
Palestinians in Lebanon
Armenians in Lebanon
Iraqis in Lebanon
Kurds in Lebanon
Turks in Lebanon
Assyrians in Lebanon
Circassians in Lebanon
French people in Lebanon 
Italians in Lebanon
Handicapped in Lebanon
Lebanese Physically Handicapped Union

Neighbors of Lebanon 
 Syria - to the north and east
 Region of Palestine (Israel) - to the south

Government and politics of Lebanon 

Politics of Lebanon
 Form of government:
 Capital of Lebanon: Beirut
 Elections in Lebanon
 2005 Lebanese general election
 2009 Lebanese general election
 Political parties in Lebanon

Branches of the government of Lebanon 

 Government of Lebanon

Executive branch of the government of Lebanon 
 Head of state: President of Lebanon, vacant
 Head of government: Prime Minister of Lebanon, Najib Mikati
 Parliament of Lebanon: Headed by Speaker Nabih Berri

Legislative branch of the government of Lebanon 

 Parliament of Lebanon: Chamber of Deputies (unicameral)

Judicial branch of the government of Lebanon 

 Court system of Lebanon

Foreign relations of Lebanon 

Foreign relations of Lebanon
 Diplomatic missions in Lebanon
 Diplomatic missions of Lebanon

International organization membership 
The Lebanese Republic is a member of:

Arab Bank for Economic Development in Africa (ABEDA)
Arab Fund for Economic and Development (AFESD)
Arab Monetary Fund (AMF)
Food and Agriculture Organization (FAO)
Group of 24 (G24)
Group of 77 (G77)
International Atomic Energy Agency (IAEA)
International Bank for Reconstruction and Development (IBRD)
International Chamber of Commerce (ICC)
International Civil Aviation Organization (ICAO)
International Criminal Police Organization (Interpol)
International Development Association (IDA)
International Federation of Red Cross and Red Crescent Societies (IFRCS)
International Finance Corporation (IFC)
International Fund for Agricultural Development (IFAD)
International Labour Organization (ILO)
International Maritime Organization (IMO)
International Mobile Satellite Organization (IMSO)
International Monetary Fund (IMF)
International Olympic Committee (IOC)
International Organization for Standardization (ISO)
International Red Cross and Red Crescent Movement (ICRM)
International Telecommunication Union (ITU)
International Telecommunications Satellite Organization (ITSO)

Inter-Parliamentary Union (IPU)
Islamic Development Bank (IDB)
League of Arab States (LAS)
Multilateral Investment Guarantee Agency (MIGA)
Nonaligned Movement (NAM)
Organisation internationale de la Francophonie (OIF)
Organisation of Islamic Cooperation (OIC)
Organization of American States (OAS) (observer)
Permanent Court of Arbitration (PCA)
United Nations (UN)
United Nations Conference on Trade and Development (UNCTAD)
United Nations Educational, Scientific, and Cultural Organization (UNESCO)
United Nations High Commissioner for Refugees (UNHCR)
United Nations Industrial Development Organization (UNIDO)
United Nations Relief and Works Agency for Palestine Refugees in the Near East (UNRWA)
Universal Postal Union (UPU)
World Customs Organization (WCO)
World Federation of Trade Unions (WFTU)
World Health Organization (WHO)
World Intellectual Property Organization (WIPO)
World Meteorological Organization (WMO)
World Tourism Organization (UNWTO)
World Trade Organization (WTO) (observer)

Law and order in Lebanon 

Law of Lebanon
 Constitution of Lebanon
 Crime in Lebanon
 Human rights in Lebanon
 LGBT rights in Lebanon
 Freedom of religion in Lebanon
 Law enforcement in Lebanon

Military of Lebanon 

Military of Lebanon
 Command
 Commander-in-chief: Joseph Aoun
 Ministry of National Defense
 Forces
 Army of Lebanon
 Navy of Lebanon
 Air Force of Lebanon
 Special forces of Lebanon
 Military history of Lebanon
 Wars involving the Lebanon
 Military ranks of Lebanon

Local government in Lebanon 

Local government in Lebanon

History of Lebanon 

 Economic history of Lebanon
 Military history of Lebanon
 History of Lebanon
 History of ancient Lebanon
 Prehistory of Lebanon

Culture of Lebanon 

Culture of Lebanon
 Architecture of Lebanon
 Cuisine of Lebanon
 Ethnic minorities in Lebanon
 Festivals in Lebanon
 Languages of Lebanon
 Lebanese society
 Media in Lebanon
 Museums in Lebanon
 National symbols of Lebanon
 Coat of arms of Lebanon
 Flag of Lebanon
 National anthem of Lebanon
 People of Lebanon
 Prostitution in Lebanon
 Public holidays in Lebanon
 Records of Lebanon
 Religion in Lebanon
 Armenians in Lebanon
 Buddhism in Lebanon
 Christianity in Lebanon
Druze in Lebanon
 Hinduism in Lebanon
 Islam in Lebanon
 Judaism in Lebanon
 Sikhism in Lebanon
 List of World Heritage Sites in Lebanon

Art in Lebanon 
 Art in Lebanon
 Cinema of Lebanon
 Literature of Lebanon
 Music of Lebanon
 Television in Lebanon
 Theatre in Lebanon

Sports in Lebanon 

Sports in Lebanon
 Football in Lebanon
 Lebanon at the Olympics
 Basketball in Lebanon
 Skiing in Lebanon
 Ski resorts
Lebanon Mountain Trail

Economy and infrastructure of Lebanon 

Economy of Lebanon
 Economic rank, by nominal GDP (2007): 85th (eighty-fifth)
 Agriculture in Lebanon
 Banking in Lebanon
 National Bank of Lebanon: Banque du Liban
 Communications in Lebanon
 Internet in Lebanon
 Companies of Lebanon
Currency of Lebanon: Pound
ISO 4217: LBP
 Economic history of Lebanon
 Energy in Lebanon
 Energy policy of Lebanon
 Oil industry in Lebanon
 Health care in Lebanon
 Mining in Lebanon
 National Stock Exchange of Lebanon: Beirut Stock Exchange
 Tourism in Lebanon
 Transport in Lebanon
 Airports in Lebanon
 Rail transport in Lebanon
 Roads in Lebanon
 Water supply and sanitation in Lebanon

Education in Lebanon 

Education in Lebanon

Ministry of Education and Higher Education

See also 

List of international rankings
Member state of the United Nations
Outline of Asia
Outline of geography

References

External links 

 General information
Lebanon at The World Factbook
LibanVote (comprehensive electoral database)
US State Department - Lebanon includes Background Notes, Country Study and major reports

 News
OTV
Al-Manar TV
AnNahar newspaper 
L'Orient-Le Jour (Lebanese daily newspaper in French) 
Future TV
Liban Press (Lebanese news headlines) 
Liban3000.com
Lebanese Tag 
Ya Libnan 
NOW Lebanon 
United Nations - Mehlis Report official report of the investigation into Rafiq al-Hariri's assassination

 Government
The Lebanese Governmental Portal for Information & Forms
Official site of the President of the Lebanese Republic
Official site of The Lebanese Parliament 
Central Administration for Statistics
The Lebanese Armed Forces
Ministry of Tourism
Internal Security Forces
Lebanon Customs site
Central Bank of Lebanon
Beirut Stock Exchange
Permanent Mission of Lebanon to the United Nations

 Non-Governmental Organizations
The Center for Democracy in Lebanon

 Web portals
Lebanon tourism guide Lebanon panorama tours
Lebanese White Pages
www.lebconnection.com Business networking site for the Lebanese community
Naharnet
Lebanese Tag News and events from Lebanon
Ya Libnan Live news from Beirut
LebMoon.Com Arabic Lebanese Forum
 LSCCB — Lebanese Society for Children Capacity Building

 Culture and education
UNESCO World Heritage Sites in Lebanon
Al-Bustan Festival, Beit Meri 	
Baalbek Festival
Beiteddine Festival 	
Tyre Festival
Byblos Festival
Lebanese Cultural Journal	
[https://web.archive.org/web/20180106175220/http://www.beirutnationalmuseum.com/ The National Museum of Beirut

 Festivals
Baalbeck
Beiteddine
Byblos
Tyre
Deir el Qamar

 Travel and Tourism

Libanon-Reise.de - German website with travel information about Lebanon
Ministry of Tourism - Official website of the Lebanese Ministry of Tourism
Lebanon, the Cedars' Land - Clickable Maps of Lebanon in 7 Languages with famous historic and touristic cities.

Lebanon